Urubamba (possibly from in the Quechua spelling Urupampa, flat land of spiders) is a small town in Peru, located near the Urubamba River under the snow-capped mountain Chicón. Located one hour from Cusco, Urubamba is the largest town in the Sacred Valley of the Incas. It is also located near a number of significant ruins of the Inca Empire, including Machu Picchu. The sparse remains of the Inca palace, Quispiguanca, are within the town. Tourists often come through the town on their way to visit these sites.

Geography
Urubamba is located in the Highlands of Peru. It is regarded as a good location to go to acclimate to the elevation to prevent altitude sickness prior to going more popular tourist destinations like Cusco.

Economy

There is a popular market selling fresh fruit and vegetables and also pots, pans, and other essential items. As social workers/volunteers visit the city often, the main market does cater to tourists, although locally produced alpaca garments or ornaments are usually for sale in small stores within the town. There is also a small market selling only fresh produce that is open on select days during the week, and can sometimes be found selling items that are normally not sold in the main market.

Arts and culture

Urubamba is the home of the workshop of Pablo Seminario and Marilú Behar. They create quality ceramics that can be purchased from the workshop or a store in Cusco.

There is a large sporting field used for local football matches and also for festivals, including the festival of El Señor de Torrechayoc.  During the first week of June the town swells with dancers and visitors from local towns who perform in the streets.  The festivities continue the celebration well into the early hours.  The dancing culminates with group performances on the local football pitch.

Transportation 
Due to the town's proximity to a number of Inca ruins it is a transportation hub with a bus depot and easy access to cabs.

 PeruRail

Education and service work
Urubamba is the base of operations for a variety of volunteer programs that arrange home stays with Peruvian families for college students.

See also
Quispiguanca.  Inca ruin within the city limits of Urubamba.

References

Populated places in the Cusco Region

External links 
 Website Municipalidad Provincial Urubamba
 Los cielos de Urubamba, Lima Stargazer

 
Categoría:Capitales de provincia del departamento del Cuzco